Welling Town Football Club is a football club based in Welling, London, England.

History
The club was established in 2014 by Kevin Oakes and friends as a Sunday league club. They joined Division Two of the London & Kent Suburban League, and finished third in the division in their first season, resulting in promotion to Division One. After finishing fourth in Division One the following season, the club switched to Saturday football, joining Division Three West of the Kent County League. The Sunday side continued for another two seasons.

Welling won the Barry Bundock West Kent Challenge Shield in 2016–17 and were Division Three West runners-up, earning promotion to Division Two West. They went on to win Division Two West and the Kent Junior Cup the following season, also retaining the Barry Bundock West Kent Challenge Shield. The club then successfully applied to join Division One of the Southern Counties East League, a jump of three divisions.

In their first season in the Southern Counties East League, Welling were Division One champions, earning promotion to the Premier Division.

Ground
The club moved to Bayliss Avenue in Thamesmead in 2017 after Thamesmead Town left the ground. In 2021 they relocated to Kent Football United's Efes Stadium in Dartford. For the 2022/23 season they moved to Chatham Town's Bauvill Stadium in Chatham.

Honours
Southern Counties East League
Division One champions 2018–19
Kent County League
Division Two West champions 2017–18
Barry Bundock West Kent Challenge Shield winners 2016–17, 2017–18
Kent Junior Cup
Winners 2017–18

References

External links
Official website

Football clubs in England
Football clubs in London
2014 establishments in England
Association football clubs established in 2014
Kent County League
Southern Counties East Football League
Sport in the London Borough of Bexley